Fajardo is a town and municipality-Fajardo Combined Statistical Area.

Fajardo is the hub of much of the recreational boating in Puerto Rico and a popular launching port to Culebra, Vieques, and the U.S. and British Virgin Islands. It is also home to the largest marina in the Caribbean, called Puerto del Rey. The town contains various hotels and inns.

Offshore, near Fajardo, a few islets can be found. These are Icacos, Isla Palomino, Palominito, and Diablo, among other uninhabited coral islands and barrier reefs.

History
Fajardo was founded in 1760, 1773 or 1774 (depending on the authority) as Santiago de Fajardo. It was one of the locations used by the American troops to invade Puerto Rico. On August 1, 1898 the USS Puritan under the command of Captain Frederic W. Rodgers, was sailing by the coastline of the city of Fajardo, when Rogers noticed the Faro de Las Cabezas de San Juan (Cape San Juan lighthouse) which was supposed to be the landing site for the US Army in Puerto Rico. Rodgers ordered some of his men ashore, which included Puerto Rican volunteers, with the mission of posting the American flag atop the lighthouse.

On November 14, 1824, in what was dubbed the "Foxhardo" Affair, a US Naval Officer named David Porter went ashore in Fajardo with 200 seamen and marines, threatening to destroy Fajardo because one of his men had been arrested in Puerto Rico. For taking this action without US approval, Porter was later court-martialed.

Puerto Rico was ceded by Spain in the aftermath of the Spanish–American War under the terms of the Treaty of Paris of 1898 and became a territory of the United States. In 1899, the United States Department of War conducted a census of Puerto Rico finding that the population of Fajardo was 16,782.

On September 20, 2017 Hurricane Maria struck the island of Puerto Rico. In Fajardo, the hurricane triggered numerous landslides with its strong winds and significant amount of rainfall.

Geography
Fajardo is a coastal municipality with a number of islets.
Fajardo River
Aguas Buenas Gorge, Fajardo Gorge, Juan Diego Gorge and the Mata Redonda Gorge
Aguas Prietas and Grande lagoons

Barrios

Like all municipalities of Puerto Rico, Fajardo is subdivided into barrios.

 Cabezas (Las Croabas)
 Demajagua
 Fajardo barrio-pueblo
 Florencio
 Naranjo
 Quebrada Fajardo
 Quebrada Vueltas
 Río Arriba
 Sardinera

Sectors
Barrios (which are like minor civil divisions) and subbarrios, in turn, are further subdivided into smaller local populated place areas/units called sectores (sectors in English). The types of sectores may vary, from normally sector to urbanización to reparto to barriada to residencial, among others.

Special Communities

 (Special Communities of Puerto Rico) are marginalized communities whose citizens are experiencing a certain amount of social exclusion. A map shows these communities occur in nearly every municipality of the commonwealth. Of the 742 places that were on the list in 2014, the following barrios, communities, sectors, or neighborhoods were in Fajardo: Obrera neighborhood, Roosevelt neighborhood, Mansión del Sapo, Maternillo, Media Luna, Sector Camacho, Vevé Calzada, and Vieques en el Aire.

Tourism

Fajardo is a tourist destination, especially among local tourists, because of its seafood, hotels, closeness to the small islands of Palomino, Icacos and Palominito, and the many daily trips that are available to Vieques and Culebra, both by boat and by the four airlines that served Fajardo Airport (now closed): Air Culebra, Air St. Thomas, Isla Nena Air and Vieques Air Link.

Fajardo has 46 beaches. Fajardo's beaches are bounded by calm, clear water ideal for snorkeling. Seven Seas Beach offers plentiful water sports facilities, offshore points for sailing, snorkeling and plenty of scuba diving.

Fajardo is also home to one of the few Bioluminescent Lagoons in the world. Nightly trips are offered by kayak by local companies who give educational tours.

Landmarks and places of interest

Las Cabezas de San Juan Light House - One of the oldest lighthouses in Puerto Rico. Only one used for nautical reasons in the entire island.
Laguna Grande - One of the few Bioluminescent bays in the world that glow and offers night kayaking tours all year round.
Puerto del Rey Marina - Biggest marina in the Caribbean.
U.S. Customs House - Constructed in 1930 still in use by the U.S. Customs & Border Protection.
Santiago Apostol Cathedral
El Conquistador, A Waldorf Astoria Resort. - One of Puerto Rico's most luxurious resorts, complete with its own private,  narrow gauge funicular railway connecting its main hotel building with its marina. It was closed in 2017 after Hurricane Maria, and is scheduled to reopen in Fall 2020.
Seven Seas Beach - Classified Blue Flag for its sanitary health guarantees.
Las Cabezas de San Juan Reserve - Home to mangroves and to the lighthouse.
Fajardo Port - Used by locals and tourists to visit the island municipalities of Vieques and Culebra.
The main town square - A colonial-style town square in the downtown.
Old Fajardo Sugar Cane Refinery
Isleta Marina
Las Croabas Natural Reserve
Bioluminescent Bay Fajardo
Las Croabas Recreational Park
Hipolito Robles Sports Complex
Icacos, Palomino and Palominito Cays (islets) Island Water Taxi

Economy

Industry
Electrical components, metal work, furniture manufacturing. Fajardo is also home to pharmaceutical and bio-sciences companies.

Due to its rich ports and closeness to smaller islands, Fajardo is also known for its fishing industries.

Culture

Festivals and events

Fajardo celebrates its patron saint festival in July. The  is a religious and cultural celebration that generally features parades, games, artisans, amusement rides, regional food, and live entertainment.

Other festivals and events celebrated in Fajardo include:
Bicycletada Fajardeña - April
Kite Festival - April
Kelly Cup Sailboat Regata - April
Bomba & Plena Festival - May
Paradise Fiesta - August
Cocolía Festival - November

Sports
Fajardo Soccer Stadium is a soccer-specific stadium in Fajardo, Puerto Rico, 35 miles east of Luis Muñoz Marín International Airport (SJU). The 3,800 capacity stadium was developed at a cost of $3.9M, and opened December 12, 2015 and is home venue of Puerto Rico Sol.

Fajardo in the past was home to a National Superior Basketball; Baloncesto Superior Nacional BSN basketball team, the Fajardo Cariduros or as they are known in the Island Cariduros de Fajardo. George Torres, Mario Morales and Mario Butler were three of the most famous players to play for that franchise.

In 2007, the team returned once again to the BSN. The team known as the "Titanes de Morovis" was moved to Fajardo, and was renamed "Cariduros de Fajardo". Unlike the NBA and other sports leagues in the United States, Puerto Rican franchises rarely leave the original name of the franchise when they move to a different city.

Once, there was a basketball team for the Puerto Rican Basketball League known as the "Conquistadores de Fajardo".

Fajardo also has a AA Amateur Baseball Team Los Cariduros de Fajardo and have won over 10 sectional championships, 3 time national runners-up in 1974, 2003 and 2005, and 3 times national champions in 1954, 2004 and 2010.

Demographics

Government

All municipalities in Puerto Rico are administered by a mayor, elected every four years. The current mayor of Fajardo is Aníbal Meléndez Rivera, of the New Progressive Party (PNP). He was elected at the 1988 general elections.

The city belongs to the Puerto Rico Senatorial district VIII, which is represented by two Senators. In 2012, Pedro A. Rodríguez and Luis Daniel Rivera were elected as District Senators.

Transportation 

There are 20 bridges in Fajardo.

Diego Jiménez Torres Airport was Fajardo's airport and handled commercial airline flights to the city, but it was permanently closed in 2015.

Symbols
The  has an official flag and coat of arms.

Flag
Fajardo's flag is a tricolor triband. The upper band is gules (red), symbolizing the color of the shield's border. Silver (white), the center band, stands for the color of the main pieces that appear in the shield and the crown. Azure (blue), the lower band, represents the color of the sky and the sea of Fajardo. Centered is the coat of arms of the village (villa) in natural colors.

Coat of arms
The coat of arms is formed as a square with a rounded base and stamped at the top with a crown mural of three towers. It is supported by two dolphins, and underneath the base a banner with the inscription “Santiago de Fajardo”.

Notable Fajardeños

Roberto Angleró - Music composer and singer
Carlos Arroyo - Basketball Player
Antonio R. Barceló - Politician & The First President of the Puerto Rico Senate.
Eugenio S. Belaval - Legislator
General Antonio Valero de Bernabé - Fought with Simón Bolívar.
Norma Candal - Comedian
Ivonne Coll - Actress
Héctor Cotto - Athlete
Emilio Belaval Maldonado - Served as Associate Justice for the Puerto Rico Supreme Court.
John John Molina - Boxer
Pedro Rosa Nales - TV reporter
Dr. Antonia Coello de Novelo - Former Surgeon General of the United States.
Josefina Barceló Bird de Romero - Politician
Marquita Rivera - first actress from Puerto Rico to appear in a major Hollywood motion picture.
Peter John Ramos - Basketball Player
Carlos Rivera - Professional Baseball Player
José Pérez - Actor
Ashley Cariño - Miss Universe Puerto Rico 2022

Gallery

See also

Battle of Fajardo
Bio Bay Night Kayaking Tour
Did you know-Puerto Rico?
History of Puerto Rico
List of Puerto Ricans

References

External links
Biobay Fajardo
Historic Places in Puerto Rico and the Virgin Islands, a National Park Service Discover Our Shared Heritage Travel Itinerary

 
Municipalities of Puerto Rico
Fajardo metropolitan area
Populated places established in 1772